A Candidate for a Killing is a 1969 Italian film. It starred John Richardson and Anita Ekberg.

It was an early film credit for composer Bill Conti.

References

External links

A Candidate for a Killing at Letterbox DVD

1969 films
English-language Italian films
Films produced by Sidney W. Pink
1960s English-language films
1960s Italian films